The 1971 USC Trojans football team represented the University of Southern California (USC) in the 1971 NCAA University Division football season. In their 12th year under head coach John McKay, the Trojans compiled a 6–4–1 record (3–2–1 against conference opponents), finished in second place in the Pacific-8 Conference (Pac-8), and outscored their opponents by a combined total of 229 to 164. The team was ranked #20 in the final AP Poll.

Jim Jones led the team in passing, completing 89 of 161 passes for 995 yards with seven touchdowns and ten interceptions.  Lou Harris led the team in rushing with 167 carries for 801 yards and four touchdowns. Edesel Garrison led the team in receiving with 25 catches for 475 yards and five touchdowns.

Schedule

Personnel

Season summary

at Notre Dame

at Washington

Jimmy Jones sets school record for total career touchdowns (42), breaking the old mark held by Mort Kaer.

References

USC
USC Trojans football seasons
USC Trojans football